Castlebrae Community High School is a secondary school in the neighbourhood of Niddrie, Edinburgh.

Feeder schools
Feeder primaries are Castleview, Niddrie Mill and Newcraighall.

School houses
Pupils are divided into three house groups, Blackford, Calton and Pentland. These are named after the hills in and around Edinburgh.

Proposed closure
In September 2012, it was announced that City of Edinburgh Council proposed to close the school in June 2013 because of falling rolls and poor exam results. A group of local parents and pupils contested the closure. In February 2013, a report recommended closure, with a new school to be built in the next ten years as the area regenerates and demand builds. In March, the council voted to give the school a "reprieve".

Controversy
In June 2014, the previous head teacher was suspended while allegations against him were investigated. Norma Prentice took over for 2014-15 as the investigation continued. In 2015, it was confirmed that Prentice would continue permanently and that Curran had been dismissed.

References

External links
Official School Website

Secondary schools in Edinburgh